Daniel Lee Perkins (born March 15, 1975) is an American former Major League Baseball player. A pitcher, Perkins played for the Minnesota Twins in 1999.

External links

1975 births
Living people
Major League Baseball pitchers
Minnesota Twins players
Akron Aeros players
Baseball players from Florida
Elizabethton Twins players
Fort Myers Miracle players
Fort Wayne Wizards players
New Britain Rock Cats players
Salt Lake Buzz players